The Internationalist League of Norway ( (FIN) is a group of revolutionary socialists, set up in 1999, working in sympathy with the Fourth International. Until 2002 FIN worked as a current within the Red Electoral Alliance advocating that the Red Electoral Alliance should be a broad party for revolutionaries on Norway, based on internationalism, anti-stalinism and internal democracy. Since 2002 FIN operates both within the Red Party and the Socialist Left Party.

References

1999 establishments in Norway
Communist parties in Norway
Fourth International (post-reunification)
Political parties established in 1999
Red Party (Norway)
Socialist Left Party (Norway)
Trotskyist organizations in Europe